Turkish Braille (kabartma yazı) is the braille alphabet of the Turkish language.

Alphabet
Turkish Braille follows international usage. The vowels with diacritics, ö and ü, have their French/German forms, whereas the consonants with diacritics, ç, ğ, and ş, have the forms of the nearest English approximations, ch, gh, and sh. Dotless i is derived by shifting down.

The accent point, is used for â, î, û.  Point  is used for capitals.

Punctuation
Punctuation and arithmetical signs are as follows:

For quotations, the dash — is used differently from inverted commas “...”, for example when transcribing short turns in dialog.

Extensions to other languages
These letters are used in Azeri Braille, or in the case of Turkish Braille, in foreign words. w is only used for foreign words in both Turkish and Azeri Braille. Azeri Braille uses the accent mark  to derive print ə (formerly ä) from a.

References

French-ordered braille alphabets
Turkish language